The 2012 McDonald's All-American Boys Game was an All-star basketball game that was played on Wednesday, March 28, 2012 at the United Center in Chicago, Illinois, home of the Chicago Bulls. The game's rosters featured the best and most highly recruited high school boys graduating in 2012.  The game was the 35th annual version of the McDonald's All-American Game first played in 1978. Chicago is the first city to host the game in back-to-back years.

West Roster

East Roster

Coaches
The West team was coached by:
 Head coach Gordon Kerkman of Aurora West High School (Aurora, IL)
 Asst coach Rick Thompson of Aurora West High School (Aurora, IL)
 Asst coach Curtis Shaw of Aurora West High School (Aurora, IL)

The East team was coached by:
 Head coach Billy Hicks of Scott County High School (Georgetown, KY)
 Asst coach Chris Willhite of Scott County High School (Georgetown, KY)
 Asst coach Tim Glenn of Scott County High School (Georgetown, KY)

The west team defeated the east team 106-102, with Shabazz Muhammad named the MVP of the game with 21 points and 6 rebounds.

All-American Week

Schedule

 Monday, March 26: Powerade Jamfest
 Slam Dunk Contest
 Three-Point Shoot-out
 Timed Basketball Skills Competition
 Wednesday, March 28: 35th Annual Boys All-American Game
 Thursday, March 29: 35th Annual Hudson Trophy Presentation

The Powerade JamFest is a skills-competition evening featuring basketball players who demonstrate their skills in three crowd-entertaining ways.  The slam dunk contest was first held in 1987, and a 3-point shooting challenge was added in 1989.  A timed basketball skills competition was added to the schedule of events in 2009.

Contest winners
 The 2012 Powerade Slam Dunk contest was won by Shabazz Muhammad. The winner of the 2012 3-point shoot-out was Rasheed Sulaimon. The winner of the basketball skills competition was Tyler Lewis.

See also
 2012 McDonald's All-American Girls Game

References

External links
McDonald's All-American on the web

2011–12 in American basketball
2012
2012 in sports in Illinois
Basketball in Illinois